The Iveco EuroTrakker is a truck produced by Iveco for use in construction and off-road. Externally, it resembles the EuroTech, with which it shares the cab and many other features. However, it has a stronger frame, greater ground clearance, different axles and optional all-wheel drive.

Overview
The EuroTrakker was first released in 1993. When it entered South Korea, it imported dump trucks for the first time through Halla Heavy Industries, but the import was practically discontinued when Halla went bankrupt due to the IMF bailout in 1997. The EuroTrakker was discontinued in 2004 when its successor, the Trakker, was released. In Libya, the EuroTrakker is manufactured under the Trucks and Bus Company brand name.

References

External links 

EuroTrakker
Cab over vehicles